Neoaulacoryssus is a genus of beetles in the family Carabidae, containing the following species:

 Neoaulacoryssus cupripennis (Gory, 1833)
 Neoaulacoryssus speciosus (Dejean, 1829)

References

Harpalinae